Woking is a large town and borough in Surrey, England.

Woking may also refer to:
 Woking, Alberta, a small hamlet in Alberta, Canada
 Woking (hundred), a hundred in what is now Surrey, England
 Woking (UK Parliament constituency), a constituency represented in the House of Commons 
 Woking railway station, a railway station serving Woking, Surrey, England
 Woking F.C., a football club from Woking, Surrey, England 
 Old Woking, a former village now considered part of the town of Woking, Surrey, England
 Woking College, a Sixth Form College situated in Woking, Surrey, England
 Woking High School, a high school in Woking, Surrey, England

See also 
 Wokingham, a market town in Berkshire, England